Bianca Krijgsman (born 3 October 1968) is a comedian and Dutch actress. She won the prize for best actress at the 42nd International Emmy for her role in the television film De Nieuwe Wereld.

References

External links

1968 births
Living people
Dutch film actresses
Dutch stage actresses
Dutch television actresses
International Emmy Award for Best Actress winners
People from Zijpe
20th-century Dutch actresses
21st-century Dutch actresses
People from Schagen